Walenty is a given name. Notable people with the name include:

Jan Walenty Tomaka (born 1949), Polish politician
Jan Walenty Węgierski (1755–1796), Deputy Chancellor and Chamberlain of last king of Poland
Walenty Kłyszejko (1909–1987), Estonian-Polish basketball player, coach, and professor at the Józef Piłsudski University, Warsaw
Walenty Musielak (born 1913), Polish soccer player
Walenty Pytel, Polish born contemporary artist and metal sculptor
Walenty Stefański (1813–1877), Polish bookseller, political activist, co-founder of the Polish League
Walenty Wańkowicz (1799–1842), Polish painter
Walenty Żebrowski (died 1764), notable 18th-century Polish painter and a member of the Bernardine order

Polish masculine given names